Mashina is an Israeli rock band which was active from 1983 to 1995, and then again from 2003 to the present. The band is considered by many to be Israel's most important and influential rock band. Their musical style took inspiration from ska and hard rock, among others.

History
Mashina was formed by singer Yuval Banai, a member of the noted Banai family. His father, the late Yossi, was an actor and singer, as are uncles Gavri and Ya'akov, along with many of Yuval's cousins. During his army service, Banai met guitar player Shlomi Bracha and the two started playing music together. A friend of theirs, a recent Russian immigrant, suggested they call their band "Machina Vremeni", which means "time machine" in Russian (this suggestion may have been inspired by the well-known Russian rock band Mashina Vremeni of the 1960s and 1970s).

After the army service the two split up; Banai formed the band "Shlom Ha-Tzibur" ("Public Safety"), while Bracha teamed up with bassist Michael Benson to form the band "HaChazit Ha'amamit" ("The Popular Front"). In 1984 they decided to combine to form a new band, which they called Mashina, bringing in drummer Iggy Dayan; in 1985, they released their self-titled debut, which quickly became a hit on the Israeli charts. Later, Avner Hodorov joined the band on keyboard and saxophone. They gained widespread popularity in Israel during the late 1980s and early 1990s.

In May 1995, the band announced their retirement and put together four heavily publicized farewell shows. What would have been their fourth and final performance, in Arad, Israel, ended when three of the spectators were crushed to death by the crowd before the band went onstage. The band played another farewell concert several months later at Yarkon Park, which they dedicated to those three fans.

After Mashina broke up, Banai released 3 solo albums: "Yuval Banai" (1997), "Rashi Dub" (1999) (produced by bass player Yossi Fine) and "Nish'ar BaMakom" ("Staying in Place") (2001). Bracha released a solo album, and Benson co-founded the electronic-rock group Atmosfire, which came out with one album.

The band re-formed in 2003 and began touring and releasing albums again. On October 8, 2006, the band performed at the opening ceremony of the 27th Acco Festival of Alternative Israeli Theatre.

Mashina has gone on several North American tours, playing in cities including Philadelphia, New York, Boston, Toronto, Washington and Los Angeles.

Banai and Bracha served as co-mentors on season 2 of The Voice Israel, in 2012–2013.

Music
The musical growth of Mashina can be mapped to different influences across their albums. Their early sound was obviously imitative of ska bands like Madness; they didn't bother to hide the influence, titling what became one of their earliest hit songs "Rakevet Laila Le-Kahir" ("Night Train to Cairo"), an homage to Madness' "Night Boat to Cairo", or "Geveret Sarah Hashchena" ("Miss Sarah, the Neighbour") that copied the theme, music and opening lyrics of Bob Dylan's "The Hurricane". Their subsequent albums combined reggae, punk rock and Middle Eastern elements. "Ha'Amuta Le-Heker Hatmuta" ("The Society for the Study of Mortality") has sounds influenced by The Cure, "Miflatzot Ha-Tehila" ("The Monsters of Fame") has sounds influenced by The Pixies and grunge, "Si Ha-Regesh" ("Peak of Excitement") has the blues influence of Pink Floyd, and "Lehitra'ot Ne'urim Shalom Ahava" ("Goodbye Youth, Hello Love") presents the anthemic quality of U2 and Simple Minds.

Their lyrics tend to be cynical, sometimes humorously so. They have common themes of alienation, the struggle of everyday life and a desire for some sort of physical or spiritual escape.

Band members
 Yuval Banay - vocals, acoustic guitar
 Shlomi Bracha - electric guitar
 Iggy Dayan - drums
 Avner Hodorov - keyboard, saxophone, accordion
 Michael Benson - bass guitar, vocals
 Supporting members
 Ilan Gozal - Management
 Yossi Lugassi - sound
 Izhar Rhozental - light
 Ilan Lamdan - sound monitor
 Amalia Banay  - video editor
 Ofir Sonnenschein - back stage

Discography

Albums

Compilations

 Total sales: 420,000+

References

External links
 Official site
 Jewish News Weekly article from their 2005 U.S. tour

Banai family
Israeli rock music groups
Israeli alternative rock groups
Israeli new wave musical groups
Pop rock groups
Ska groups
Musical groups established in 1983